The 2002–03 Superliga Española de Hockey Hielo season was the 29th season of the Superliga Española de Hockey Hielo, the top level of ice hockey in Spain. Six teams participated in the league, and CH Jaca won the championship.

Standings

Playoffs

Semifinal 
 CH Jaca – CG Puigcerdà 2:1 (5:2, 4:6, 6:3)
 FC Barcelona – CH Madrid 2:0 (10:1, 3:2)

Final 
 CH Jaca – FC Barcelona 3:0 (6:2, 8:3, 7:4)

External links
Season on hockeyarchives.info

Liga Nacional de Hockey Hielo seasons
Spa
Liga